Isabelle de Charrière (20 October 174027 December 1805), known as Belle van Zuylen in the Netherlands, née Isabella Agneta Elisabeth van Tuyll van Serooskerken, and [Madame] Isabelle de Charrière (married name) elsewhere, was a Dutch and Swiss writer of the Enlightenment who lived the latter half of her life in Colombier, Neuchâtel. She is now best known for her letters and novels, although she also wrote pamphlets, music and plays. She took a keen interest in the society and politics of her age, and her work around the time of the French Revolution is regarded as being of particular interest.

Early life 
Isabelle van Tuyll van Serooskerken was born in Zuylen Castle in Zuilen near Utrecht in the Netherlands, to Diederik Jacob van Tuyll van Serooskerken (1707–1776), and Jacoba Helena de Vicq (1724–1768). She was the eldest of seven children. Her parents were described by the Scots author James Boswell, then a student in law in Utrecht and one of her suitors, as "one of the most ancient noblemen in the Seven Provinces" and "an Amsterdam lady, with a great deal of money." In winter they lived in their house in the city of Utrecht.

In 1750, Isabelle was sent to Geneva and travelled through Switzerland and France with her French-speaking governess Jeanne-Louise Prevost, who was her teacher from 1746-1753. Having spoken only French for a year, she had to relearn Dutch on returning home to the Netherlands. However, French would remain her preferred language for the rest of her life, which helps to explain why, for a long time, her work was not as well known in her country of birth as it otherwise might have been.

Isabelle enjoyed a much broader education than was usual for girls at that time, thanks to the liberal views of her parents who also let her study subjects like mathematics, physics and languages including Latin, Italian, German and English. By all accounts, she was a gifted student. Always interested in music, in 1790 she began studying with composer Niccolò Zingarelli.

At the age of 14 years she fell in love with the Roman Catholic Polish count Peter Dönhoff. He was not interested in her. Disappointed, she left Utrecht for 18 months. As she grew older, various suitors appeared on the scene only to be rejected because they promised to visit her, but did not, or to withdraw themselves because she was superior. She saw marriage as a way to gain freedom but she also wanted to marry for love.

Invited specially by Anne Pollexfen Drake and also her husband lieutenant general George Eliott to come to their London home in Curzon Street, Mayfair, Isabelle did come by boat from Hellevoetsluis to Harwich 7 November 1766 accompanied by her brother Ditie, her maid Doortje and her valet Vitel.

Later life 
Eventually, in 1771, she married the Swiss Charles-Emmanuel de Charrière de Penthaz (1735–1808) born in Colombier, the former private tutor of her brother Willem René abroad from 1763 to 1766. Subsequently, she was known as Isabelle de Charrière. They settled at Le Pontet in Colombier (near Neuchâtel), bought by his grandfather Béat Louis de Muralt, with her father-in-law François (1697–1780) and her two unmarried sisters-in-law Louise (1731–1810) and Henriette (1740–1814). The Canton of Neuchâtel was then ruled by Frederick the Great as prince of Neuchâtel in personal union with Prussia. Neuchâtel enjoyed freedom of religion which resulted in the arrival of many refugees including Jean-Jacques Rousseau, Béat Louis de Muralt and David Wemyss, Lord Elcho. The couple also spent significant amounts of time in Geneva and Paris.

De Charrière became rich by modern standards in 1778 by partly inheriting the fortunes of her parents, including for nearly 40% investments in the colonial compagnies such as the Dutch West India Company (WIC), Dutch East India Company (VOC), the British East India Company and the South Sea Company depending on profitable overseas slavery in plantations.

According to the opinion of Drieënhuizen and Douze in their publication of 2021 in her letters and in her novel Trois Femmes (Three Women, 1795-1798) De Charrière mentioned slavery uncritically. However, the opposite was the case while she wrote about what she called the horrors (horreurs) in the colonies in a letter (number 1894, of 1798, so she was not indifferent to excesses of slavery, as was detailed by the editor of her correspondence Suzan van Dijk.
Within five years after her inheritance De Charrière sold 70% of her colonial investments.

Correspondence 
Isabelle de Charrière kept up an extensive correspondence with numerous people, including intellectuals like David-Louis Constant d'Hermenches, James Boswell, Benjamin Constant and her German translator Ludwig Ferdinand Huber.

In 1760, Isabelle met David-Louis Constant d'Hermenches (1722–1785), a married Swiss officer regarded in society as a Don Juan. After much hesitation, Isabelle's need for self-expression overcame her scruples and, after a second meeting two years later, she began an intimate and secret correspondence with him for about 15 years. Constant d'Hermenches was to be one of her most important correspondents.

The Scottish writer James Boswell met her frequently in Utrecht and in Castle Zuylen in 1763-1764, when he studied law at the Utrecht University. He called her Zélide, like in her selfportrait. He became a regular correspondent for several years after leaving the Netherlands, going on Grand Tour. He wrote her that he was not in love with her. She replied: "We agree, because I have no talent for subordination". In 1766 he did send a conditional proposal to her father after meeting her brother in Paris, but the fathers did not agree to a marriage.

In 1786, Mme de Charrière met Constant d'Hermenches' nephew, the writer Benjamin Constant, in Paris. He visited her in Colombier several times. There they wrote an epistolary novel together, and an exchange of letters began that would last until the end of her life.
She also had an interesting correspondence with her young friends Henriette L'Hardy and Isabelle Morel. Huber's young stepdaughter Therese Forster lived with her from 1801 until Isabelle de Charrière's death.

Works 
Isabelle de Charrière wrote novels, pamphlets, plays, and poems and composed music. Her most productive period came only after she had been living in Colombier for a number of years. Themes included her religious doubts, the nobility and the upbringing of women.

Her first novel, Le Noble, was published in 1763. It was a satire against the nobility and although it was published anonymously, her identity was soon discovered and her parents withdrew the work from sale. Then she wrote a portrait of herself for her friends: Portrait de Mll de Z., sous le nom de Zélide, fait par elle-même. 1762. In 1784 she published two fictional works, Lettres neuchâteloises and Lettres de Mistriss Henley publiées par son amie. Both were epistolary novels, a form she continued to favour. In 1788, she published her first pamphlets about the political situation in the Netherlands, France and Switzerland.

As an admirer of the philosopher Jean-Jacques Rousseau, she assisted in the posthumous publication of his work, Confessions, in 1789. She also wrote her own pamphlets on Rousseau around this time.

The French Revolution caused a number of nobles to flee to Neuchâtel and Mme de Charrière befriended some of them. But she also published works criticising the attitudes of the aristocratic refugees, most of who she felt had learned nothing from the Revolution.

She wrote or at least planned words and music for several musical works, but none survive beyond fragments. She sent a libretto of Les Phéniciennes to Mozart, hoping that he would set it, but no reply is known. All of her musical works are included in volume 10 of her Œuvres complètes; these include six minuets for string quartet, nine piano sonatas, and ten airs and romances.

Critical publications of the original texts 
 Œuvres complètes, Édition critique par J-D. Candaux, C.P. Courtney, P.H. Dubois, S. Dubois-de Bruyn, P. Thompson, J. Vercruysse, D.M. Wood. Amsterdam, G.A. van Oorschot, 1979–1984. Tomes 1-6, Correspondance; tome 7, Theatre; tomes 8-9, Romans, Contes et Nouvelles; tome 10, Essais, Vers, Musique. 
 Die wiedergefundene Handschrift: Victoire ou la vertu sans bruit. Hrsg. Magdalene Heuser. In: Editio. Internationales Jahrbuch für Editionswissenschaft. 11 (1997), p. 178–204.
 'Early writings. New material from Dutch archives]. Ed. Kees van Strien, Leuven, Éditions Peeters, 2005. VI-338 p. 
 Correspondances et textes inédits. Ed. Guillemette Samson, J-D. Candaux, J. Vercruysse et D. Wood. Paris, Honoré Champion, 2006 423 p.  

Translations
 Letters written from Lausanne. Translated from the French. Bath, printed by R. Cruttwell and sold by C. Dilly, Poultry, London, 1799. 2 vols. viii, 175 p. + 200 p.
 Four tales by Zélide. Translated [and abridged] by S[ybil]. M[arjorie]. S[cott-Cuffe] with an introduction by Geoffrey Scott. [The Nobleman, Mistress Henley, Letters from Lausanne, Letters from Lausanne-Caliste]. London, Constable, 1925. xxix, 263 p. Reprint by Books for Libraries Press, Freeport, New York, 1970. Reprint by Turtle Point Press, Chappaqua, New York,  1997. 304 p.
 Letters from Mistress Henley published by her friend. Translation Philip Stewart and Jean Vaché.  Introduction, notes and bibliography by Joan Hinde Stewart & Philip Stuart. New York, The Modern Language Association of America, 1993. xxix, 42 p.
 Letters from Switzerland. [Letters from Neuchatel, Letters from Mistress Henley, Letters from Lausanne, Letters from Lausanne-Caliste]. Ed., translation and biography James Chesterman. Cambridge U.K., Carole Green Publishing, 2001. xii, 276 p.  
 Three women. A novel by the abbé de la Tour. Translation Emma Rooksby. New York, The Modern Language Association of America, 2007. xii, 176 p. 
 The Nobleman and Other Romances. [The Nobleman; Letters from Neuchâtel; Letters from Mistress Henley Published by Her Friend; Letters from Lausanne: Cécile; Eaglonette and Suggestina, or, On Pliancy; Émigré Letters; Fragments of Two Novels Written in English: A Correspondence, Letters from Peter and William; Constance's Story; Saint Anne], Translated, introduction and notes Caroline Warman. Cover ill. Joanna Walsh. New York, Penguin Classics, 2012. XXXIII, 439 p. 
 Honorine d'Userche [a novella by Abbé de la Tour], translator Caroline Omolesky, e-book, Messidor Press, 2013.

Correspondence
 Boswell in Holland, including his correspondence with Belle de Zuylen (Zélide). Ed. Frederick Pottle. 428 p. London: William Heinemann, 1952.
 Letter of Isabelle de Charrière to James Boswell 27 March 1768. Published in The General Correspondence of James Boswell (1766–1769), ed. Richard Cole, Peter Baker, Edinburgh University Press, 1993, vol.2, p. 40-41.
 There are no letters like yours. The correspondence of Isabelle de Charrière and Constant d'Hermences. Translated, with an introduction and annotations by Janet Whatley and Malcolm Whatley. Lincoln NE, University of Nebraska Press, 2000. xxxv, 549 p.

Le Noble, conte moral, 1763 

Belle van Zuylen published this short early novel anonymously when she was 22 in a French-language magazine with the Amsterdam publisher Evert van Harrevelt.
Van Zuylen's parents bought the entire book edition in 1763, in order to prevent further distribution of this satire on the nobility. But this "moral tale" nevertheless found its way into Europe, because the German poet and statesman Johann Wolfgang Goethe reviewed the German translation Die Vorzüge des alten Adels on November 3, 1772 in the "Frankfurter Gelehrten Anzeigen".
An opera buffa adaptation in Dutch De Deugd is den Adel waerdig (Vertu vaut bien noblesse) was performed on March 2, 1769 in the Fransche Comedie theater in The Hague.

A quote from the fable Education about two dogs by Jean de La Fontaine opens the novel:

 Miscellany 
 The asteroid 9604 Bellevanzuylen was named in her honour in 1991 by Eric Walter Elst.
 The film Belle van Zuylen - Madame de Charrière was directed by Digna Sinke in 1993.
 The Belle van Zuylen Chair of Utrecht University, Netherlands, was held by Cecil Courtney (1995), Monique Moser-Verrey (April 2005), Nicole Pellegrin-Postel (October 2005)
 The annual Belle van Zuylen Lecture, on themes relating to literature and society in general, is part of the International Literature Festival Utrecht (ILFU), formerly called City2Cities, delivered by contemporary authors such as Hans Magnus Enzensberger (2006), Jeanette Winterson (2007), Azar Nafisi (2009) and Paul Auster (2012), Chimamanda Ngozi Adichie (2020) and Margaret Atwood (2021). Since 2020 they receive a little sculpture called the Belle van Zuylenring.

Bibliography
In chronological order by publication year:
 Philippe Godet: Madame de Charrière et ses amis, d’après de nombreux documents inédits (1740-1805) avec portraits, vues, autographes, etc.. Genève, A. Jullien, 1906 (xiii,519 p. + 448 p.). Genève, Slatkine Reprints, 1973.
 Geoffrey Scott. The portrait of Zélide. London, Constable, 1925. xiii, 215 p.He has won the James Tait Black Memorial Prize 1925 for this biography. Scott on Zélide : the portrait of Zélide. Introduction by Richard Holmes. London, Flamingo, 2002. Reprint by Turtle Point Press, New York, 2010. 256 p. with an introduction by Shirley Hazzard, afterword by Richard Dunn.
 Constance Thompson Pasquali, Madame de Charrière à Colombier : iconographie, Neuchâtel, Bibliothèque de la Ville, 1979
 C.P. Courtney. A preliminary bibliography of Isabelle de Charrière (Belle de Zuylen). Oxford, Voltaire Foundation, 1980. 157 p.
 C.P. Courtney. Isabelle de Charrière (Belle de Zuylen). A secondary bibliography. Oxford, Voltaire Foundation, 1982. 50 p.
 C.P. Courtney. Isabelle de Charrière and the 'Character of H.B. Constant'. A false attribution. In: French Studies (Oxford), 36 (1982), no. 3, p. 282-289.
 C.P. Courtney, Isabelle de Charrière (Belle de Zuylen). A biography. Oxford, Voltaire Foundation, 1993. 810 p. 
 Kathleen M. Jaeger, Male and Female Roles in the Eighteenth Century. The Challenge to Replacement and Displacement in the Novels of Isabelle de Charrière, New York, Peter Lang, 1994. XI, 241 pp.  
 C.P. Courtney, Belle van Zuylen and Philosophy. Utrecht, Universiteit Utrecht, 1995. 32 p.
 Jacquline Letzter, Intellectual tacking. Questions of education in the works of Isabelle de Charrière. Amsterdam, Rodopi, 1998. 217 p. 
 Jacquline Letzter and Robert Adelson, Women Writing Opera: Creativity and Controversy in the Age of the French Revolution. Berkeley, University of California Press, 2001. xvii, 341 p. 
 Carla Alison Hesse, The other enlightenment: how French women became modern. Princeton NJ, Princeton University Press, 2001. - XVI, 233p.   
 Vincent Giroud and Janet Whatley, Isabelle de Charrière. Proceedings of the international conference held at Yale University, 2002. New Haven CT. The Beinecke rare book and manuscript library, 2004. v, 151 p. 
 Jelka Samsom, Individuation and attachment in the works of Isabelle de Charrière New York, Peter Lang, 2005. 
 Monique Moser-Verrey, Isabelle de Charrière and the Novel in the 18th century. Utrecht, Universiteit Utrecht, 2005. 32 p.
 Nicole Pellegrin, Useless or pleasant? Women and the writing of history at the time of Belle van Zuylen (1740–1805). Utrecht, University Utrecht, 2005. 32 p.
 Suzan van Dijk, Valérie Cossy, Monique Moser, Madeleine van Strien, Belle de Zuylen/Isabelle de Charrière: Education, Creation, Reception. Amsterdam, Rodopi, 2006, 343 p. 
 Gillian E. Dow, Translators, interpreters, mediators: women writers 1700-1900. [Mary Wollstonecraft, Isabelle de Charrière, Therese Huber, Elizabeth Barrett Browning, Fatma Aliye, Anna Jameson, Anne Gilchrist] Oxford, Peter Lang, 2007. 268 p. 
 Heidi Bostic, The fiction of enlightenment: women of reason in the French eighteenth century'' [Francoise de Graffigny, Marie-Jeanne Riccoboni, Isabelle de Charrière. Newark DE, University of Delaware Press, 2010. 270 p.

Notes

External links

 Madame de Charrière website (in Dutch and French)]
 Belle van Zuylen website (in Dutch and French, site of the Genootschap Belle van Zuylen)
 Bibliographic database 1: by name to 2007
 Complementary bibliografic database 2: by year, with additions before 2007
 La Correspondance d'Isabelle de Charrière (in Dutch and French)
 Compositions of Isabelle de Charrière
 
 Bulletins of the Genootschap Belle van Zuylen:
 Lettre de Zuylen et du Pontet 1976-2005
 Global index of the Lettre de Zuylen et du Pontet
 Lettre de Zuylen 1976-1980 ISSN 0920-945X
 Lettre de Zuylen et du Pontet 1981-2005 ISSN 0920-9468
 Cahiers ISABELLE DE CHARRIÈRE / BELLE DE ZUYLEN Papers 2006-2015 ISSN 1872-7832
 Lettre de Zuylen 2017 - 
 Womenwriters database Isabelle de Charrière 
 Works of Isabelle de Charrière
 Revised thesis of Dennis Wood 1998 The novels of isabelle de Charrière
 Images:
 Silhouette of Isabelle de Charrière by Marianne Moula (1760-1826)
 Miniature-painting of Charles-Emmanuel de Charrière by Léonard Isaac Arlaud (1767-1800). Genève Bibliothèque Publique et Universitaire
 Miniature-painting of Isabelle de Charrière by Léonard Isaac Arlaud (1767-1800). Genève, Bibliothèque Publique et Universitaire
 SIEFAR Dictionary 2002
 Goddess of the Netherlands, Radio Netherlands Worldwide (RNW) Archives
 RNW broadcast Passport to literature: Belle de Zuylen

1740 births
1805 deaths
18th-century Dutch women writers
18th-century Dutch writers
Dutch composers
Dutch nobility
Dutch women writers
Dutch women composers
French-language writers from the Netherlands
French-language poets
People from Maarssen
Pseudonymous women writers
18th-century dramatists and playwrights
English–French translators
18th-century philosophers
Dutch women philosophers
18th-century translators
18th-century letter writers
18th-century pseudonymous writers